The 1976–77 FA Trophy was the eighth season of the FA Trophy.

Preliminary round

Ties

Replays

2nd replay

First qualifying round

Ties

Replays

2nd replays

Second qualifying round

Ties

Replays

2nd replay

Third qualifying round

Ties

Replays

1st round
The teams that given byes to this round are Scarborough, Matlock Town, Morecambe, Stafford Rangers, Telford United, Hillingdon Borough, Wimbledon, Romford, Weymouth, Wigan Athletic, Bromsgrove Rovers, Grantham, Bedford Town, Kettering Town, Boston United, Merthyr Tydfil, Burton Albion, Margate, Yeovil Town, Atherstone Town, Runcorn, Lancaster City, Enfield, Wycombe Wanderers, Dagenham, Tooting & Mitcham United, Leatherhead, Marine, Blyth Spartans, Willington, Spennymoor United and Falmouth Town.

Ties

Replays

2nd round

Ties

Replays

2nd replays

3rd round

Ties

Replays

2nd replay

4th round

Ties

Replays

Semi finals

First leg

Second leg

Replay

2nd replay

Final

References

General
 Football Club History Database: FA Trophy 1976-77

Specific

1976–77 domestic association football cups
League
1976-77